Ro-47 was an Imperial Japanese Navy Kaichū type submarine of the K6 sub-class. Completed and commissioned in January 1944, she served in World War II in operations related to the Mariana and Palau Islands campaign. She was sunk in September 1944 during her second war patrol.

Design and description
The submarines of the K6 sub-class were versions of the preceding K5 sub-class with greater range and diving depth. They displaced  surfaced and  submerged.

For surface running, the boats were powered by two  diesel engines, each driving one propeller shaft. When submerged each propeller was driven by a  electric motor. They could reach  on the surface and  underwater.

The boats were armed with four internal bow  torpedo tubes and carried a total of ten torpedoes. They were also armed with a single  L/40 anti-aircraft gun and two single  AA guns.

Construction and commissioning

Ro-47 was laid down as Submarine No. 388 on 28 December 1942 by Mitsui Zosensho at Tamano, Japan. She was launched on 30 August 1943, and was renamed Ro-47 that day. She was completed and commissioned on 31 January 1944.

Service history

January–May 1944
Upon commissioning, Ro-47 was attached to the Maizuru Naval District. Ro-47 got underway from Kure, Japan, that day, called at Tokuyama to refuel from 28 to 29 March 1944, and set out for her patrol area. On 5 April 1944 she was recalled to Kure, which she reached on 13 April 1944. She was reassigned to Submarine Division 34 in the 6th Fleet on 14 May 1944.

First war patrol

On 13 June 1944 the Combined Fleet activated Operation A-Go for the defense of the Mariana Islands, and that day the commander-in-chief of the 6th Fleet, Vice Admiral Takeo Takagi, ordered all available Japanese submarines to deploy east of the Marianas. Accordingly, Ro-47 departed Yokosuka, Japan, to begin her first war patrol, assigned a patrol area in the Marianas off Saipan, where the Battle of Saipan began with U.S. landings on the island on 15 June 1944. In July 1944, the 6th Fleet ordered most of its submarines, including Ro-47, to withdraw from the Marianas. Ro-47 departed her patrol area on 10 July 1944 and on 16 July arrived at Maizuru, where she began repairs and an overhaul. She later moved to Kure.

Second war patrol

On 15 September 1944, U.S. forces invaded the Palau Islands, landing on Angaur and on Peleliu. Ro-47 got underway from Kure on 17 September 1944 with orders to attack the U.S. invasion fleet off Peleliu, assigned a patrol area south of the Palaus. On 24 September 1944, she received an order to proceed at full speed to a new patrol area in the Philippine Sea east of the Palaus. The Japanese never heard from her again.

Loss

When she closed with it and challenged it, it disappeared from radar, indicating a diving submarine. At 02:18, McCoy Reynolds launched the first of six Hedgehog barrages.

The submarine McCoy Reynolds sank probably was Ro-47. On 2 November 1944, the Imperial Japanese Navy declared Ro-47 to be presumed lost off the Palau Islands with all 76 men on board. She was stricken from the Navy list on 10 March 1945.

Notes

References
 

 

Ro-35-class submarines
Kaichū type submarines
Ships built by Mitsui Engineering and Shipbuilding
1943 ships
World War II submarines of Japan
Japanese submarines lost during World War II
World War II shipwrecks in the Philippine Sea
Maritime incidents in September 1944
Ships lost with all hands
Submarines sunk by United States warships